Bheu António Januário (born 11 August 1993) is a Mozambican international footballer who plays for UD Songo, as a right back.

Career
Born in Beira, Januário has played for Liga Desportiva de Maputo, Nacional da Madeira, AD Fafe and UD Songo.

He made his international debut for Mozambique in 2016.

References

1993 births
Living people
People from Beira, Mozambique
Mozambican footballers
Mozambique international footballers
Liga Desportiva de Maputo players
C.D. Nacional players
AD Fafe players
UD Songo players
Moçambola players
Liga Portugal 2 players
Campeonato de Portugal (league) players
Association football fullbacks
Mozambican expatriate footballers
Mozambican expatriate sportspeople in Portugal
Expatriate footballers in Portugal
2022 African Nations Championship players
Mozambique A' international footballers